Anthony J. Staskunas (born January 3, 1961) is an American Democratic politician and lawyer.

Biography
Born in West Allis, Wisconsin, Staskunas graduated from Nathan Hale High School in West Allis. He received his bachelor's degree from University of Wisconsin–Milwaukee and his J.D. degree from University of Wisconsin Law School. He also served on the West Allis Common Council. Staskunas has served as a member of the Wisconsin State Assembly, representing the 15th Assembly District since his election in 1996. In April 2012, Staskunas announced his retirement from the Wisconsin State Assembly.

Notes

External links

 
 Follow the Money - Tony Staskunas
2008 2006 2004 2002 2000 1998 campaign contributions
Campaign 2008 campaign contributions at Wisconsin Democracy Campaign

1961 births
Living people
People from West Allis, Wisconsin
University of Wisconsin–Milwaukee alumni
University of Wisconsin Law School alumni
Wisconsin city council members
Democratic Party members of the Wisconsin State Assembly
American people of Lithuanian descent
Wisconsin lawyers
21st-century American politicians